The Shire of Douglas is a local government area in Far North Queensland. It is located on the coast north of the city of Cairns. Following a poll in 2013, the Shire of Douglas was re-established on 1 January 2014.

The major industries are tourism and sugar production. Minor industries include tropical fruit and beef.

History
Kuku Yalanji  (also known as Gugu Yalanji, Kuku Yalaja, and Kuku Yelandji) is an Australian Aboriginal language of the Mossman and Daintree areas of  North Queensland. The language region includes areas within the local government area of Shire of Douglas and Shire of Cook, particularly the localities of Mossman, Daintree, Bloomfield River, China Camp, Maytown, Palmer, Cape Tribulation and Wujal Wujal.

Yalanji  (also known as Kuku Yalanji, Kuku Yalaja, Kuku Yelandji, and Gugu Yalanji) is an Australian Aboriginal language of Far North Queensland. The traditional language region is Mossman River in the south to the Annan River in the north, bordered by the Pacific Ocean in the east and extending inland to west of Mount Mulgrave. This includes the local government boundaries of the Shire of Douglas, the Shire of Cook and the Aboriginal Shire of Wujal Wujal and the towns and localities of Cooktown,  Mossman, Daintree, Cape Tribulation and Wujal Wujal. It includes the head of the Palmer River, the Bloomfield River, China Camp, Maytown, and Palmerville.
On 11 November 1879, the Cairns Division was one of the initial 74 divisions created under the Divisional Boards Act 1879.
On 3 June 1880, the northern part of Cairns Division was excised to create Douglas Division.

With the passage of the Local Authorities Act 1902, Douglas Division became the Shire of Douglas on 31 March 1903.

On 15 March 2008, under the Local Government (Reform Implementation) Act 2007 passed by the Parliament of Queensland on 10 August 2007, the Shire of Douglas merged with the City of Cairns to form the Cairns Region.

In 2012, a proposal was made to de-amalgamate the Shire of Douglas from the Cairns Region. On 6 December 2012, the Queensland Minister for Local Government, the Hon. David Crisafulli, granted the people of the former Douglas Shire a vote on possible de-amalgamation from the Cairns Regional Council, even though the Queensland Treasury Corporation had calculated the costs to be too high a burden on the few ratepayers of this small Shire, and the Shire to be unviable in the long term.
Despite strong opposition from many parties, on 9 March 2013 the citizens of the former Douglas shire voted in a referendum to de-amalgamate. The shire was re-established on 1 January 2014.

Towns and localities
The Douglas Shire Council's administrative centre is in Mossman.

The Shire of Douglas includes the following settlements:

 Mossman
 Port Douglas
 Bamboo
 Bonnie Doon
 Bloomfield1
 Cape Kimberley
 Cape Tribulation
 Cassowary
 Cooya Beach
 Cow Bay
 Craiglie
 Dagmar
 Daintree
 Dayman Point

 Dedin
 Degarra
 Diwan
 Ellis Beach2
 Finlay Vale
 Forest Creek
 Four Mile Beach
 Killaloe
 Low Isles
 Lower Daintree
 Miallo
 Mossman Gorge
 Mowbray

 Newell
 Noah
 Oak Beach
 Rocky Point
 Shannonvale
 Spurgeon
 Stewart Creek Valley
 Syndicate
 Thornton Beach
 Upper Daintree
 Wangetti
 Whyanbeel
 Wonga Beach

1 – shared with the Shire of Cook2 – until 1995, it was part of the Shire, now it's part of the Cairns Region

Libraries 
The Douglas Shire Council operates public libraries at Mossman and Port Douglas.

Population

Chairmen and mayors
The following were the chairmen and mayors of the Shire of Douglas in its first incarnation:

The following were the mayors of Shire of Douglas in its second incarnation:

References

Further reading

  — a history of the Shire of Douglas

External links

 University of Queensland: Queensland Places: Douglas Shire
Douglas Shire Historical Society
 Pro amalgamation website Happy With Cairns
 Pro amalgamation website People Of Douglas
 De-amalgamation website Friends Of Douglas Shire
 Douglas Shire Independent News

 
Far North Queensland
1880 establishments in Australia
Local government areas of Queensland
2008 disestablishments in Australia
Populated places disestablished in 2008
2014 establishments in Australia
Former local government areas of Queensland